The 2009–10 season was Hereford United's 29th season in the Football League and the club competed in Football League Two, the fourth tier of English football. Having been promoted from this division in 2007–08, Hereford spent the previous season in Football League One and were relegated in 24th place.

John Trewick managed his first full season at the club, having taken charge of the club for the final two matches of the 2008–09 season. Former manager Graham Turner remained as chairman and director of football. Trewick built an almost entirely new squad, with just four players – Matt Done, Sam Gwynne, Craig Jones and Richard Rose – retained from the previous season.

The club spent the majority of the season in the bottom half of the table, and Trewick was sacked mid-season. Turner became caretaker manager until the end of the season and guided the club to a final position of 16th. Progress was made in all three cup competitions, with a run to the last eight of the Football League Trophy ending in a 4–1 home defeat to MK Dons.

This season saw a number of changes off the field. A new home and away strip was launched as the club announced a three-year deal with shirt suppliers Admiral, the away colours changing from yellow to orange. The club's shirt sponsor changed from Sun Valley to parent company Cargill. At the end of the season, Turner announced that the majority shareholding of the club was for sale, and on 4 June 2010 it was announced that he had left the club, bringing 15 years of service to an end, and that David Keyte had taken over as chairman with Tim Russon as vice-chairman.

Pre-season

League Two

FA Cup

League Cup

Football League Trophy
Hereford United will enter the Football League Trophy at the First Round stage. The First Round match will be played during the week commencing 31 August 2009.

Herefordshire Senior Cup
The format of the Herefordshire Senior Cup was changed from a knockout competition to a one-off final: the winners of the County Challenge Cup play Hereford United in a pre-season match.

Squad statistics

Transfers

In

Out

(*) fee believed to be in the region of £200,000.

Loan in

Loan out

References

Hereford United F.C. seasons
Hereford United